The Monument to José Martí is an instance of public art in Madrid, Spain. A gift from the Republic of Cuba to Madrid, the monument is dedicated to José Martí, a Cuban writer and activist noted for his struggle in favour of the independence from Spain.

History and description 
Gifted by the Republic of Cuba to Madrid, the monument was authored by José Villa (sculptor) and Rómulo Fernández (architect).

Standing 7.90 metre high, the monument consists of a cuboid with a (1.80 x 1.80) m base, bifurcating in two bodies upon its upper part. Weighing 15 tonnes, it is made of steel and marble. It is ornamented by the star from the flag of Cuba.

The front side displays a relief depicting the bust of José Martí.

It was unveiled in October 1986 during a ceremony attended by Juan Barranco (Mayor of Madrid) and Armando Hart (Cuban Minister of Culture). It is located at the plaza de Quito, a widening of the  consisting of an open space with two fountains, pines, cypresses, and hybrid planes.

In popular culture 
The monument is featured in the 1995 film El día de la bestia (The Day of the Beast).

References 
Citations

Bibliography
 
 
 

Stone sculptures in Spain
Steel sculptures in Spain
Outdoor sculptures in Madrid
Monuments and memorials in Madrid
Buildings and structures in El Viso neighborhood, Madrid
Cuba–Spain relations